Bledar Kola (born 1 August 1972) is an Albanian retired football player and later manager.

Early life
Kola comes from Mirditë, but grew up in the city of Lezhë. He was an exemplary student. He started his career at Besëlidhja Lezhë, and then moved to Partizani Tirana. Later he moved to Greece where his playing career took off.

Playing career

Club
Kola spent most of his career playing for various clubs in the Greek Super League, including Panathinaikos, Apollon Smyrnis, Panargiakos and AEK Athens . In January 2003, Kola was sacked by Kallithea after failing a doping test.

International
He made his debut for Albania in a December 1990 European Championship qualification match away against Spain and earned a total of 39 caps, scoring 6 goals. His final international was a March 2001 FIFA World Cup qualification against England in Tirana.

National team statistics

International goals
Scores and results list Albania's goal tally first, score column indicates score after each Kola goal.

Managerial career
Kola took temporary charge at AEK Athens in August 2010 and was named full-time manager of Apollon Smyrni in July 2012. He also coached Panargiakos and was assistant at Panathinaikos and later to AEK manager Marinos Ouzounidis until they were both dismissed in 2019.

Honours
AEK Athens
Greek Cup: 2001–02

References

External links

1972 births
Living people
People from Mirditë
Albanian emigrants to Greece
Association football midfielders
Albanian footballers
Albania international footballers
Besëlidhja Lezhë players
FK Partizani Tirana players
KF Elbasani players
Panargiakos F.C. players
Apollon Smyrnis F.C. players
Panathinaikos F.C. players
AEK Athens F.C. players
Kallithea F.C. players
Super League Greece players
Albanian expatriate footballers
Expatriate footballers in Greece
Albanian expatriate sportspeople in Greece
Albanian football managers
Doping cases in association football
Albanian sportspeople in doping cases
AEK Athens F.C. managers
Apollon Smyrnis F.C. managers
Panargiakos F.C. managers
Panathinaikos F.C. non-playing staff
Albanian expatriate football managers
Expatriate football managers in Greece
Albanian expatriate sportspeople in Cyprus
Albanian expatriate sportspeople in Romania